The Pakistan Hindu Panchayat (Urdu:پاکستان ہندو پنچایت ) (PHP) is the leading socio-political representative organization of the Hindu community in Pakistan.

Hindus of Pakistan

Hindus in Pakistan nowadays make 2% of the total population, roughly 4 million people. The Hindu minority has reserved seats in the National Assembly and can also vote for their local candidate.
 
Hindus are mainly concentrated in the Province of Sindh where they form around nearly 8% of the population.

Mission and Organization
The PHP represents the Hindu community on social and political issues, bringing them together to protect their interests, advance education and opportunity and protect the basic rights and freedoms, especially of worship and assembly, of Hindus all over Pakistan.

Representation with Government
The PHP organizes support for the Hindu candidates in Hindu electorates, and lobbies the Government of Pakistan on issues important to Hindus, such as the security of temples, and contentious issues like protests against the abduction of Hindus for ransoms and forcible conversions.

The PHP holds an annual national conference, and has branches in all Pakistani provinces, champions the minority rights. Another important and linked organization is the Pakistani Hindu Welfare Association.

See also

Dalit Sujag Tehreek
Shri Hinglaj Mata temple
Hinduism in Pakistan
Hindu and Buddhist architectural heritage of Pakistan
Pakistan Hindu Council

References

External links
 Official website

Hindu organisations based in Pakistan
Secularism in Pakistan
Religious organizations established in 2005
Hindu organizations established in the 21st century